The 2020 Indiana Hoosiers baseball team are a college baseball team that represented Indiana University in the 2020 NCAA Division I baseball season. The Hoosiers are members of the Big Ten Conference (B1G) and play their home games at Bart Kaufman Field in Bloomington, Indiana. They are led by second-year head coach Jeff Mercer. On March 12, 2020, the Big Ten Conference cancelled the remainder of all winter and spring sports seasons due to the COVID-19 pandemic.

Previous season
The Hoosiers finished the 2019 NCAA Division I baseball season 37–23 overall (17–7 conference) and first place in conference standings. Following the conclusion of the regular season, the Hoosiers were selected to play in the 2019 NCAA Tournament, beginning in the Louisville Regional. The Hoosiers would eventually lose in the semifinal round of the Louisville Regional to College World Series semifinalist Louisville by a score of 7–9.

MLB Draft 
The following Hoosiers on the 2019 roster were selected in the 2019 Major League Baseball draft:

* indicates draftee had no more college eligibility

Preseason
On September 5, 2019, the Hoosiers announced the hiring of Derek Simmons as the team's newest assistant coach.

On October 10, 2019, Indiana's head coach Jeff Mercer announced two title changes to existing coaches; Justin Parker transitioned to Associate Head Coach/Pitching, while Denton Sagerman was moved to Director of Operations/Pitching Development.

Season projections
Coming off of an NCAA Regional appearance in 2019, the 2020 Hoosiers are projected to finish fourth in conference play by D1Baseball and Baseball America, while Indiana is predicted to finish fifth by B1G coaches. The Hoosiers received votes for rankings in other major preseason polls, to include NCBWA, USA Today Coaches and Collegiate Baseball.

Roster

Schedule

! style="" | Regular Season
|- valign="top" 

|- bgcolor="#ffcccc"
| 1 || February 14 || at No. 11 LSU || || Alex Box Stadium, Skip Bertman Field • Baton Rouge, Louisiana || 1–8 
|11,421|| 0–1 || –
|- bgcolor="#ffcccc"
| 2 ||  || at No. 11 LSU || || Alex Box Stadium, Skip Bertman Field • Baton Rouge, Louisiana  || 4–7 
|10,859|| 0–2 || –
|- bgcolor="#ccffcc"
| 3 ||  || at No. 11 LSU || || Alex Box Stadium, Skip Bertman Field • Baton Rouge, Louisiana  || 7–2 
|10,508|| 1–2 || –
|- bgcolor="#ccffcc"
| 4 || February 21 || vs  || || Mobile, Alabama(South Alabama Tournament) || 3–2 
| 1,304|| 2–2 || –
|- bgcolor="#ccffcc"
| 5 || February 22 || vs No. 30 South Alabama || || Mobile, Alabama(South Alabama Tournament) || 4–2 
|1,318|| 3–2 || –
|- bgcolor="#ccffcc"
| 6 || February 23 || vs  || || Mobile, Alabama(South Alabama Tournament) || 12–3 
|1,250|| 4–2 || –
|- bgcolor="#bbbbbb"
| 7 || February 26 ||  || || Bart Kaufman Field • Bloomington, Indiana || Cancelled 
| || 4–2 || –
|- bgcolor="#ccffcc"
| 8 || February 28 || vs No. 17  || || Greenville, North Carolina(Keith LeClaire Classic) || 11–5 
|3,275|| 5–2 || –
|- bgcolor="#ccffcc"
| 9 || February 29 || vs  || || Greenville, North Carolina(Keith LeClaire Classic) || 5–1 
| -|| 6–2 || –
|-

|- bgcolor="#ffcccc"
| 10 || March 1 || vs No. 13 Ole Miss || || Greenville, North Carolina(Keith LeClaire Classic) || 5–9 
| -|| 6–3 || –
|- bgcolor="#ccffcc"
| 11 || March 4 || Purdue || || Bart Kaufman Field • Bloomington, Indiana || 17–2 
|1,668|| 7–3 || –
|- bgcolor="#bbbbbb"
| || March 6 ||  || || Bart Kaufman Field • Bloomington, Indiana || Cancelled 
| || – || –
|- bgcolor="#ccffcc"
| 12 ||  ||  || || Bart Kaufman Field • Bloomington, Indiana || 9–2 
|1,875|| 8–3 || –
|- bgcolor="#ffcccc"
| 13 ||  || San Diego || || Bart Kaufman Field • Bloomington, Indiana || 2–6 
|1,875|| 8–4 || –
|- bgcolor="#ffcccc"
| 14 || March 8 || San Diego || || Bart Kaufman Field • Bloomington, Indiana || 5–13 
|1,818|| 8–5 || –
|- bgcolor="#ffcccc"
| 15 || March 10 || at  || || Charles H. Braun Stadium • Evansville, Indiana || 4–5 
|1,067|| 8–6 || –
|- bgcolor="#bbffbb"
| 16 || March 11 ||  || || Bart Kaufman Field • Bloomington, Indiana || 6-2 
|1,234|| 9-6 || –
|- align="center" bgcolor=
| 17 || March 13 ||  || || Bart Kaufman Field • Bloomington, Indiana || – 
| || – || –
|- align="center" bgcolor=
| 18 || March 14 || Memphis || || Bart Kaufman Field • Bloomington, Indiana || – 
| || – || –
|- align="center" bgcolor=
| 19 || March 15 || Memphis || || Bart Kaufman Field • Bloomington, Indiana || – 
| || – || –
|- align="center" bgcolor=
| 20 || March 17 || Kentucky || || Bart Kaufman Field • Bloomington, Indiana || – 
| || – || –
|- align="center" bgcolor=
| 21 || March 20 ||  || || Bart Kaufman Field • Bloomington, Indiana || – 
| || – || –
|- align="center" bgcolor=
| 22 || March 21 || Illinois State || || Bart Kaufman Field • Bloomington, Indiana || – 
| || – || –
|- align="center" bgcolor=
| 23 || March 22 || Illinois State || || Bart Kaufman Field • Bloomington, Indiana || – 
| || – || –
|- align="center" bgcolor=
| 24 || March 27 ||  || || Bart Kaufman Field • Bloomington, Indiana || – 
| || – || –
|- align="center" bgcolor=
| 25 || March 28 || Ohio State || || Bart Kaufman Field • Bloomington, Indiana || – 
| || – || –
|- align="center" bgcolor=
| 26 || March 29 || Ohio State || || Bart Kaufman Field • Bloomington, Indiana || – 
| || – || –
|- align="center" bgcolor=
| 27 || March 31 || at  || || Ball Diamond • Muncie, Indiana || – 
| || – || –
|-

|- align="center" bgcolor=
| 28 || April 3 || at  || || Medlar Field • University Park, Pennsylvania || – || – || –
|- align="center" bgcolor=
| 29 || April 4 || at Penn State || || Medlar Field • University Park, Pennsylvania || – || – || –
|- align="center" bgcolor=
| 30 || April 5 || at Penn State || || Medlar Field • University Park, Pennsylvania || – || – || –
|- align="center" bgcolor=
| 31 || April 7 ||  || || Bart Kaufman Field • Bloomington, Indiana || – || – || –
|- align="center" bgcolor=
| 32 || April 10 || at  || || Rocky Miller Park • Evanston, Illinois || –|| – || –
|- align="center" bgcolor=
| 33 || April 11 || at Northwestern || || Rocky Miller Park • Evanston, Illinois || – || – || –
|- align="center" bgcolor=
| 34 || April 12 || at Northwestern || || Rocky Miller Park • Evanston, Illinois || – || – || –
|- align="center" bgcolor=
| 35 || April 15 ||  || || Bart Kaufman Field • Bloomington, Indiana || – || – || –
|- align="center" bgcolor=
| 36 || April 17 ||  || || Bart Kaufman Field • Bloomington, Indiana || – || – || –
|- align="center" bgcolor=
| 37 || April 18 || Michigan State || || Bart Kaufman Field • Bloomington, Indiana || – || – || –
|- align="center" bgcolor=
| 38 || April 19 || Michigan State || || Bart Kaufman Field • Bloomington, Indiana || – || – || –
|- align="center" bgcolor=
| 39 || April 21 || at Indiana State || || Bob Warn Field at Sycamore Stadium • Terre Haute, Indiana || – || – || –
|- align="center" bgcolor=
| 40 || April 24 || at  || || Bainton Field • Piscataway, New Jersey || – || – || –
|- align="center" bgcolor=
| 41 || April 25 || at Rutgers || || Bainton Field • Piscataway, New Jersey || – || – || –
|- align="center" bgcolor=
| 42 || April 26 || at Rutgers || || Bainton Field • Piscataway, New Jersey || – || – || –
|- align="center" bgcolor=
| 43 || April 28 || vs  || || Victory Field • Indianapolis, Indiana || – || – || –
|-

|-
| style="font-size:88%" | "#" represents ranking. All rankings from Collegiate Baseball on the date of the contest."()" represents postseason seeding in the Big 10 Tournament or NCAA Regional, respectively.
|-
| Schedule Source
|-

On March 12, it was announced that the remainder of the 2020 season would be cancelled, due to the COVID-19 pandemic.

Ranking movements

Awards and honors

Pre-season awards / Watch list

Regular season awards / Watch lists

Conference awards

Award watch lists

References

Indiana
Indiana Hoosiers baseball seasons
Indiana